Hans Holbein the Younger (c. 1497–1543) was a German artist and printmaker who worked in a Northern Renaissance style. He is best known as one of the greatest portraitists of the 16th century. He also made a significant contribution to the history of book design, and produced religious art, satire, and Reformation propaganda.

Born in Augsburg, Holbein worked mainly in Basel as a young artist, painting murals and religious works and drawing designs for stained glass and printed books. He produced the occasional portrait, and made his international mark with portraits of the famous humanist Desiderius Erasmus of Rotterdam. When the Reformation reached Basel, Holbein produced works for reformist clients while continuing to serve traditional religious patrons. His late-Gothic style was influenced by artistic trends in Italy, France and the Netherlands, as well as by Renaissance humanism, resulting in a combined aesthetic that was uniquely his own.

Holbein travelled to England in 1526 in search of work, armed with a recommendation from Erasmus. He was welcomed into the humanist circle of Thomas More, where he soon built a high reputation. After returning to Basel for four years, in 1532 he resumed his career in England, where he worked for Anne Boleyn and Thomas Cromwell, and was appointed King's Painter to Henry VIII. In this role, he produced designs for jewellery, plate, and other precious objects, as well as for festive decorations. His portraits of the king and his family and courtiers provide a vivid record of a brilliant court, during a momentous period when Henry was assuming power as the Supreme Head of the English church.

Paintings

Copies and derivative works

References

References

Bätschmann, Oskar, & Pascal Griener. Hans Holbein. London: Reaktion Books, 1997. .
Buck, Stephanie. Hans Holbein, Cologne: Könemann, 1999, .

Foister, Susan. Holbein in England. London: Tate: 2006. .
Franklin-Harkrider, Melissa. Women, Reform and Community in Early Modern England. Boydell Press, 2008. google books preview
Ganz, Paul. The Paintings of Hans Holbein: First Complete Edition. London: Phaidon, 1956. OCLC 2105129.
Hearn, Karen. Dynasties: Painting in Tudor and Jacobean England, 1530–1630. London: Tate Publishing, 1995. .
de Lisle, Leanda. The Sisters Who Would Be Queen. Random House Publishing Group, 2009. google books preview
Müller, Christian; Stephan Kemperdick; Maryan W. Ainsworth; et al.. Hans Holbein the Younger: The Basel Years, 1515–1532. Munich: Prestel, 2006. .
Parker, K. T. The Drawings of Hans Holbein at Windsor Castle. Oxford: Phaidon, 1945. OCLC 822974.
Roskill, Mark, & John Oliver Hand (eds). Hans Holbein: Paintings, Prints, and Reception. Washington: National Gallery of Art, 2001. .
Rowlands, John. The Age of Dürer and Holbein. London: British Museum, 1988. .
Rowlands, John. Holbein: The Paintings of Hans Holbein the Younger. Boston: David R. Godine, 1985. .
Strong, Roy. Holbein: The Complete Paintings. London: Granada, 1980. .
Strong, Roy. Tudor & Jacobean Portraits. London: HMSO, 1969. OCLC 71370718.
Zwingenberger, Jeanette. The Shadow of Death in the Work of Hans Holbein the Younger. London: Parkstone Press, 1999. .

External links

2006 exhibition Holbein in England at Tate Britain

 
Holbein